Maud Rosemary Peto (1916–1998) was a British painter and artist. She was titled Viscountess Hinchingbroke from 1934 to 1958.

Biography
Peto was born in London to Major Sir Ralph Harding Peto and Frances Ruby Vera Lindsay, a family of artists, and studied drawing at the Westminster School of Art during 1931 and 1932 and then, after a career break, at the Royal College of Art from 1953 to 1956. A medical course led Peto to an interest in biology and plants and both plant and flowers featured heavily in her first solo exhibition at the Sally Hunt & Patrick Seale Fine Art gallery in 1985. After her marriage to Victor Montagu, Peto was known as Viscountess Hinchingbroke. After her death, at Salisbury in Wiltshire, a retrospective exhibition of her paintings was held at the Mall Galleries in London during 1999.

References

1916 births
1998 deaths
20th-century English women artists
Alumni of the Royal College of Art
Alumni of the Westminster School of Art
English women painters
Painters from London
British viscountesses